Kingston Power Station can refer to one of several power stations:

Kingston Power Station, London
Kingston Fossil Plant, in Kingston, Tennessee, US
Kingston Powerhouse, in Canberra, Australia
Cowes Power Station, also known as Kingston Power Station, on the Isle of Wight